A breezeway is an architectural feature similar to a hallway that allows the passage of a breeze between structures to accommodate high winds, allow aeration, or provide aesthetic design variation. It is a pedestrian walkway because it is intended for walking between two structures.

Often a breezeway is a simple roof connecting two structures (such as a house and a garage); sometimes it can be much more like a tunnel with windows on either side. It may also refer to a hallway between two wings of a larger building – such as between a house and a garage – that lacks heating and cooling but allows sheltered passage. Breezeways have been used to house restaurants as well.

One of the earliest breezeway designs to be architecturally designed and published was designed by Frank Lloyd Wright in 1900 for the B. Harley Bradley House in Kankakee, Illinois.  However, breezeway features had come into use in vernacular architecture long before this, as for example with the dogtrot breezeway that originally connected the two elements of a double log cabin on the North American frontier.

A side-deck is the upper deck outboard of any structure such as a coachroof or doghouse, also called a breezeway.

See also
Carport
Pergola
Skyway

References

External links

Residential breezeway image

Rooms